Sharon is both a given name and a surname.

Sharon may also refer to:

Places

Australia
 Sharon, Queensland, a locality in the Bundaberg Region, Queensland

Canada
Sharon, Ontario
Sharon Peak

France 
Sharon, Saint-Plantes

Israel 
Sharon plain
Hod HaSharon
Ramat HaSharon
Hof HaSharon Regional Council
Lev HaSharon Regional Council

United Kingdom 
Sharon, Hampshire
Sharon, Nottinghamshire

United States 
Sharon, California
Sharon, Connecticut, a New England town
 Sharon (CDP), Connecticut, the main village in the town
Sharon, Georgia
Sharon, Indiana
Sharon, Kansas
Sharon, Massachusetts, a New England town
Sharon (CDP), Massachusetts, the central village in the town
Sharon (MBTA station)
Sharon, Michigan
Sharon, Madison County, Mississippi
Sharon, Missouri
Sharon, New Hampshire
Sharon, New York
Sharon, North Dakota
Sharon, Ohio
Sharon, Oklahoma
Sharon, Pennsylvania
Sharon, South Carolina
Sharon, Vermont
Sharon, West Virginia
Sharon, Wisconsin, a village in Walworth County
Sharon, Walworth County, Wisconsin, a town
Sharon, Portage County, Wisconsin, a town
New Sharon, Maine
Sharon Center, Iowa, unincorporated community
Sharon Springs, Kansas
Sharon Springs, New York
Sharon Township (disambiguation) (several places)
Sharonville, Ohio

Other uses 
The SS Sharon, a nineteenth century whaling ship whose story is detailed in In the Wake of Madness by historian Joan Druett
The Rose of Sharon, a flower of uncertain identity mentioned in English language translations of the Bible
Sharon fruit, a name for one type of Japanese persimmon developed in Israel
The Sharon School, a Jewish school in Harare, Zimbabwe
SHARON Wastewater Treatment Process
The Sharon Statement, the founding statement of principles of the Young Americans for Freedom
A song by David Bromberg from the album Demon in Disguise
Sharon Esther Spitz, the main character and protagonist of the 2D animated TV show Braceface.
Sharon (album), a 2022 album by the Cowboy Junkies

See also
HaSharon (disambiguation)